Trenčianske Stankovce  is a village and municipality in Trenčín District in the Trenčín Region of north-western Slovakia.

Geography
The municipality lies at an altitude of 220 metres and covers an area of 24.497 km2. It has a population of about 3201 people.

References

External links
http://www.statistics.sk/mosmis/eng/run.html

Villages and municipalities in Trenčín District